Mocho may refer to:

 Mocho people, an ethnic group of Mexico
 Mocho language, a Mayan language
 Mocho (volcano), in Chile
 Mocho Mountains, in Jamaica
 Mount Mocho, in California
 Mocho Subbasin, a groundwater basin in California

People with the name 
 Mocho Cota (1954–2016), Mexican wrestler
 Mocho Cota Jr. (born 1977), Mexican wrestler
 Fray Mocho (1858–1903), Argentine writer and journalist
 José Manuel Hernández, nicknamed "El Mocho" (1853–1921), Venezuelan politician

See also 
 Mucho
 Moxo (disambiguation)